HK 2016 Trebišov is an ice hockey team in Trebišov, Slovakia. They play in the Slovak 2. Liga, the third level of ice hockey in the country. The club was re-established as HK 2016 Trebišov in 2016, after three years. 

The club was founded as AZD VTJ Trebišov in 1992. They changed their name to HK Trebišov in 2006 and to current HK 2016 Trebišov in 2016.

Honours

Domestic
Slovak 2. Liga
  Winners (2): 1996–97, 1999–2000

Notable players

 Jozef Škrak
 Jaroslav Ferjo
 Stanislav Kall
 Erik Marinov
 Roman Bajzát
 Ladislav Gábriš
 Stanislav Kožár
 Peter Frühauf
 Andrej Kmeč
 Igor Liba
 Milan Staš
 Vladimír Svitek
 Michal Pahulák
 Peter Zůbek
 Igor Šalata
 Richard Miľovčík
 Štefan Rusnák
 Peter Zambori

External links
 

Trebišov
1992 establishments in Slovakia
Ice hockey clubs established in 1992
Sport in Košice Region